The Canadian Hot 100 is a chart that ranks the best-performing singles of Canada. Published by Billboard magazine, its data are similar to Billboard U.S.-based Hot 100 in that it compiles Nielsen SoundScan based collectively on each single's weekly physical and digital sales, as well as airplay. Canada's airplay chart is compiled with information collected from monitoring more than 100 stations that represent rock, country, adult contemporary and contemporary hit radio genres. The online version of the chart features the Canadian flag next to tracks that qualify as Canadian content.

In 2008, 11 singles topped the chart. Although 12 singles claimed the top spot in 52 issues of the magazine, Timbaland's "Apologize" featuring OneRepublic began its peak position in late 2007, and is thus excluded. Katy Perry and Lady Gaga each earned two number-one singles as a lead artist. Two number-one singles tied for the longest-running chart-topping single of 2008, for nine weeks: Madonna's "4 Minutes" featuring Justin Timberlake and Katy Perry's "I Kissed a Girl", although the former had a non-consecutive run. Other chart-topping singles from 2008 include Flo Rida's "Low" featuring T-Pain, which stayed at number one for eight straight weeks. Rihanna's "Take a Bow" is noted for its jump from seventieth to first place on the Canadian Hot 100, which was the largest upward movement to number one at the time.

Chart history

See also

2008 in music
List of number-one singles (Canada)

References

Canada Hot 100
2008
2008 in Canadian music